The Vanier Institute of the Family is a national, independent, charitable research and education organization that conducts, facilitates and publishes research on the diversity and complexity of family life in Canada.

Founded by then-Governor General Georges P. Vanier and Madame Pauline Vanier in 1965, the Vanier Institute offers access to publications, research initiatives, presentations and social media content to enhance the national understanding of how families interact with, have an impact on and are affected by social, economic, environment and cultural forces.

References

Vanier family
Research institutes in Canada
Social welfare charities based in Canada
Research institutes established in 1965
1965 establishments in Ontario